This gallery of flags of federal subjects of Russia shows the flags of the 83 federal subjects of Russia including six occupied Ukrainian regions.

Current federal subject flags

24 Republics

9 Krais

48 Oblasts

3 Federal cities

1 Autonomous oblast

4 Autonomous okrugs

Historical federal subject flags

Former flags of current federal subjects

Obsolete federal subjects

Notes

See also
Armorial of Russia
Flag of Russia
List of Russian flags
Flags of the Soviet Republics
List of Sakha flags

Flags of country subdivisions
 
Lists of flags of Russia
Flags